"So Called Friend" a song by Scottish band Texas, released as the lead single from their third studio album, Ricks Road (1993), on 30 August 1993. It reached number 30 on the UK Singles Chart and number four in Portugal. The song was the theme song of the TV series Ellen.

Track listings
7-inch and cassette single
 "So Called Friend" – 3:45
 "You're the One I Want It For" – 4:57

CD1
 "So Called Friend" – 3:45
 "You're the One I Want It For" – 4:57
 "Tonight I Stay with You" – 4:12
 "I've Been Missing You" – 3:15

CD2
 "So Called Friend" – 3:45
 "You're the One I Want It For" – 4:57
 "Mothers Heaven" (French remix) – 4:13
 "Tired of Being Alone" – 2:59

Charts

References

1993 singles
1993 songs
Ellen (TV series)
Songs written by Johnny McElhone
Songs written by Sharleen Spiteri
Television talk show theme songs
Texas (band) songs
Vertigo Records singles